The Dean Soltero is a guitar manufactured by Dean Guitars and was first introduced in 2006. It was designed by Dean Zelinsky, resembles the Gibson Les Paul, and has the classic Dean V profile neck. Soltero means "single" in Spanish and refers to the single cut style of the guitar. The first 100 guitars were hand-signed by Dean himself. Available in four models: USA,  USA MHG, Japanese and Korean models. Among the famous guitarists who play a Dean Soltero are Jerry Cantrell of Alice in Chains, and Leslie West, who has his own signature model.

See also
Gibson Guitars
Gibson Les Paul
Dean Cadillac

References

External links
Official Dean Website
Guitarists with Dean Soltero

Soltero